Dušan Ristić (born November 27, 1995) is a Serbian professional basketball player for Galatasaray Nef of the Turkish Basketball Super League and the Basketball Champions League. He played college basketball for the Arizona Wildcats.

Early career
Dušan grew up with Crvena zvezda youth team. Ristić made his debut with Zvezda second team Radnički FMP during the 2012–13 season.

Ristić made his debut with the first team of Crvena zvezda during the 2013–14 ABA League season. He also played two games in the Euroleague. However, he decided not to sign professional contract with club.

In January 2014, he went to Sunrise Christian Academy in Wichita, Kansas.

College career
On March 8, 2014, Ristić, committed to play basketball for the Arizona Wildcats. On Twitter, he announced that he will play his senior year for the Wildcats and finish his education. During his senior season, he was a teammate with future NBA draft first overall pick Deandre Ayton, where Ristić was the starting center that year, while Ayton played as the starting power forward that year. He became the all-time winningest player in program history with 115 victories, surpassing Matt Muehlebach (1988–91) and Kaleb Tarczewski (2013–16) at 110 win. His senior year, Ristic was a second-team All-Pac-12 selection, and a member of the Pac-12 all-tournament team. He also became 28th Wildcat in Arizona history to score 1,000 points and grab 500 rebounds in a career.

College statistics

|-
| style="text-align:left;"| 2014–15
| style="text-align:left;"| Arizona
| 36 || 0 || 8.6 || .615 || .800 || .512 || 2.1 || .5 || .5 || .25 || 3.4
|-
|style="text-align:left;"| 2015–16
| style="text-align:left;"| Arizona
| 34 || 9 || 16.5 || .550 || .375 || .634 || 3.8 || .8 || .1 || .7 || 7.1
|-
|style="text-align:left;"| 2016–17
| style="text-align:left;"| Arizona
| 36 || 34 || 22.8 || .556 || .500 || .765 || 5.5 || .4 || .3 || .4 || 10.9
|-
|style="text-align:left;"| 2017–18
| style="text-align:left;"| Arizona
| 35 || 35 || 27.1 || .569 || .400 || .790 || 6.9 || .9 || .4 || .5 || 12.2
|-
| style="text-align:left;"| Career
| style="text-align:left;"|
| 141 || 78 || 18.7 || .565 || .467 || .698 || 4.6 || .5 || .3 || .5 || 8.4

Professional career
After going undrafted in the 2018 NBA draft, Ristić was originally named a member of the 2018 NBA Summer League Phoenix Suns, being reunited with Ayton in the process, but he later backed out on his decision there.

On July 16, 2018, Ristić signed a three-year deal with Crvena zvezda. In July 2019, Ristić was loaned out to Astana of the Kazakhstan Championship and the VTB United League for the 2019–20 season. In July 2020, he returned to the Zvezda after his one-year loan. In July 2020, Ristić was loaned to Brescia Leonessa for the 2020–21 season. In January 2021, he was transferred from Brescia to Avtodor Saratov of the VTB United League for the rest of the 2020–21 season.

In June 2021, Ristić signed for Urbas Fuenlabrada of the Liga ACB.

On December 28, 2022, he signed with Galatasaray Nef of the Turkish Basketball Super League.

Personal life 
Ristić earned his bachelor's degree in psychology and sport management from the University of Arizona in 2018.

References

External links

 Dušan Ristić at aba-liga.com
 Dušan Ristić at draftexpress.com
 Dušan Ristić at euroleague.net
 Dusan Ristic at fiba.com

1995 births
Living people
ABA League players
Arizona Wildcats men's basketball players
Baloncesto Fuenlabrada players
Basket Brescia Leonessa players
Basketball League of Serbia players
Basketball players from Novi Sad
BC Astana players
Centers (basketball)
Galatasaray S.K. (men's basketball) players
KK Crvena zvezda players
KK Radnički FMP players
Liga ACB players
Lega Basket Serie A players
Serbian men's basketball players
Serbia men's national basketball team players
Serbian expatriate basketball people in Italy
Serbian expatriate basketball people in Kazakhstan
Serbian expatriate basketball people in Russia
Serbian expatriate basketball people in Spain
Serbian expatriate basketball people in the United States